Leonor Magdalena Varela Palma (born 29 December 1972) is a Chilean actress. She played the title role in the 1999 television film Cleopatra, and vampire princess Nyssa Damaskinos in the 2002 Marvel Comics film Blade II.

Early life 
Varela was born in Santiago, Chile, the daughter of Leonor Palma-Keller, a massage therapist, and biologist and cognitive neuroscientist Francisco Varela García. She has a sister, Alejandra, and two brothers, Javier and Gabriel. When Varela was a child, her family fled Chile after the 1973 military coup d'état. In the early 1980s, her parents moved back to Chile while she remained in Paris where she studied acting at the Niels Arestrup School, L'École du Passage, and Conservatoire Supérieur de Paris.

Career

Varela's first acting job was in 1995, playing Anette in Pony Trek, a children's film. Filming was in Iceland and Leonor was riding horses for three months. Then, referred to a French filmmaker by her dentist, she played in Shooting Stars (1997). Varela found her popularity on the rise at home when she was cast in the Chilean soap opera Tic Tac.

After appearing in a few more television productions in the late 1990s, Varela was cast in a small role in The Man in the Iron Mask. In 1999, she played the title character in the TV movie Cleopatra.

She had roles in The Tailor of Panama and Texas Rangers (both in 2001) shortly thereafter, then played vampire princess Nyssa in the 2002 blockbuster film Blade II. After that she appeared in Paraíso B and Pas Si Grave.

Varela also had a short recurring role in the Fox Television series Arrested Development as the original Marta. She was nominated for the Ariel Award in 2005 in the category of Best Actress for Innocent Voices (2004). She also had a non-recurring role in Stargate: Atlantis.

She appeared in Americano and played journalist Jordana Garcia in the film Goal II: Living the Dream.

In 2012, she appeared as Marta Del Sol on the TNT television series Dallas.

Personal life
Varela was engaged to Billy Zane, her co-star in the 1999 television film Cleopatra, from 1999 to 2001.

She began dating producer Lucas Akoskin in 2011, and they married in April 2013. In November 2012, Varela and Akoskin welcomed their first child together, a son named Matteo. Their daughter, Luna Mae, was born on February 25, 2015. Matteo was diagnosed with leukodystrophy (specifically an AGS) shortly after his birth. He died at the age of 5 on November 16, 2018.

Varela, a vegetarian, is a marine life activist who is concerned with the welfare of whales, working with groups such as Save The Whales Again.

Filmography

Film

Television

References

External links

 
 

1972 births
Chilean television actresses
Chilean female models
Chilean film actresses
Living people
People from Santiago
Actresses from Santiago
20th-century Chilean actresses
21st-century Chilean actresses
Naturalized citizens of the United States